The Coupe Van der Straeten Ponthoz, also known as Coupe Ponthoz, was an international competition for football clubs from Europe that ran from 1900 to 1909. It was one of the first European club football tournaments and is considered a predecessor of club tournaments in Europe, namely the European Cup. It was named in honor of the donator of the trophy Carl van der Straten-Ponthoz

History
It was invented in 1900 at the instigation of Count van der Straten-Ponthoz, who offered the cup to the winners of an international tournament held in Brussels featuring six teams, including the champions of Belgium (Racing Club), the Netherlands (H.V.V.) and Switzerland (Grasshopper Club). As these were the only existing leagues in continental Europe, the local newspapers at that time dubbed the tournament the club championship of the continent. Thus, the winners of the first edition, R.A.P. from the Netherlands, might be considered the first ever continental European Champions, although this title is also contested by Vienna Cricket and Football-Club, who were the winners of the first Challenge Cup in 1897, a competition between clubs in Austria-Hungary. However, this tournament up until the 1900–01 season, only featured teams from Vienna, so the 7–0 win by Cricket over Wiener FC 1898 on 21 November 1897 may not be regarded as the first ever truly international club final, and neither Cricket, the first ever international club champions.

This cup tournament was held annually in Belgium from 1900 to 1907, but in 1908 this competition was replaced by the Coupe Jean Dupuich, which ran until the mid-20s. Besides Belgium, the Netherlands and Switzerland, clubs from England and France also participated in the competition. Just as the Challenge Cup is seen as the predecessor to the Mitropa Cup, established in 1927, the Coupe Van der Straeten Ponthoz is seen as the predecessor to the European Cup, established in 1955.

1900 Coupe Van der Straeten Ponthoz

All matches of the first edition were held at Léopold FC's ground in The Hague, and the first round saw both Belgian clubs being defeated in front of their own people, and to add salt to injury, they both lost to Dutch clubs, which then reached the final held on 16 April 1900. In the final, the reigning Dutch champions H.V.V. lost to R.A.P. (1–2), who had also beaten the champions of Belgium and Switzerland on their way to lifting the trophy, which means that R.A.P. played and defeated the three reigning champions of the only existing leagues in continental Europe at the time. HVV led for most of the match, but two late goals from RAP's Jan van den Berg and Julius Hisgen made up for an epic turnaround.

1901 Coupe Van der Straeten Ponthoz
The second edition brought together only Belgian and Dutch clubs, and the title holders R.A.P. started off the tournament as they had left it: By surprising everyone, this time with an 11–2 trashing of Athletic & Running Club, but they were then knocked out in the quarter-finals by the eventual champions H.B.S., who won the tournament with only two goals scored and none conceded, beating Racing Club de Bruxelles 1–0 in the final. This tournament was also wrapped up in controversy. The semi-final between H.V.V. and Racing Club was stopped after the former withdrew with the score at 2-2, claiming that they were discontent with the refereeing who was allowing too much foul play. The controversy raised the question of whether should be an “independent body for the management of football competitions”. The exchange of ideas and letters that followed were important elements in the foundation of FIFA in 1904.

Results

1902 Coupe Van der Straeten Ponthoz
In 1902, the competition was expanded and saw the inclusion of a French and an English club for the first time, France sent Racing Club de Roubaix, the 1902 Champions of France, although they Forfeited in the first round, and England sent Pilgrims F.C., which was a combination of Belgian (such as the goalkeeper Grisar) and English players (from various English cities, and some of them active in Belgium, such as Herbert Potts of Beerschot) formed on the occasion of this tournament. The Belgian clubs were left humiliated once again, going out of the tournament with 2–8, 1–4 and 4–0 defeats. Pilgrims FC took the trophy to London after beating D.F.C. 4–2 in the final.

Results

1903 Coupe Van der Straeten Ponthoz
In addition to Pilgrims F.C., a second English team participated, Maidstone (Maidstone Church Institute Wanderers FC), which was narrowly defeated in the first round by the eventual champions Racing Club de Bruxelles, marking the first time a Belgian club lifted the trophy, doing so after getting the better of Pilgrims in the final in a thrilling 6–5 win after extra-time. Notably Pilgrims never scored less than 5 goals per match, trashing the likes of Daring Club de Bruxelles (6–0), Olympia Club de Bruxelles (8–1) and Union Saint-Gilloise (6–1) on their road to the final, and then scoring 5 goals in the final itself as well, but somehow that wasn't enough to lift the trophy for the second time in a row. Another notable result was a 10-goal thriller between Royal Léopold FC and D.F.C., ending in a 7–3 to the latter.

Results

1904 Coupe Van der Straeten Ponthoz
The fifth edition of this cup saw Racing Club de Bruxelles become the first club in the competition's history to retain the title after beating fellow Belgians Union Saint-Gilloise 3–2 in the final. The title-holders Pilgrims F.C., was part of the original draw, but in the end their place was taken by Beerschot. All the matches were held at Antwerp (Beerschot's ground) and Brussels (Léopold and Racing's ground such as Vivier d'Oie and Uccle).

Results

1905 Coupe Van der Straeten Ponthoz
The sixth edition of the competition was contested by four Belgian clubs, two Dutch clubs, and two English clubs, the latter's two representants being both debutants, East Sheen F.C. and Notts Magdala F.C., and they were both eliminated in the first round. Both semi-finals were a Belgian-Dutch affair, and both ended with a Belgian victory, thus setting an all-Belgian final for the second time in a row, and again between Union Saint-Gilloise and Racing Club de Bruxelles. The latter had won the previous final 3–2, but this time it was Union who got the better of their rivals with a comfortable 5–1 victory, thus winning the Coupe Van der Straeten Ponthoz for the first time.

Results

1906 Coupe Van der Straeten Ponthoz
The seventh edition of the competition saw Union Saint-Gilloise and Racing Club de Bruxelles proving to be the strongest teams in the Low Countries by reaching the final of the tournament for the third time in a row.  Union was at the peak of its golden age which won six out of seven national championships between 1904 and 1910, but Racing strongly contested their bid for supremacy and managed to hold them to a 1–1 draw, which forced extra-time where again both teams scored to level the scores at 2. Rather than simply replaying the match, the organization was left clueless on how to handle the situation and after contacting the secretary of the English FA, it was decided to proclaim both teams as "joint holders", meaning a third title to Racing and the second in a row to Union.

Results

1907 Coupe Van der Straeten Ponthoz
The eighth and last edition of the competition was by far the most international one since it had clubs from 5 different countries: Belgium, the Netherlands, France, England, and the debutants Germany, whose representative was Dortmund FC. France sent Racing Club de Roubaix (they had participated in the 1902 edition), the 1906 Champions of France, and this time the French did not Forfeit, but nevertheless, they still went out in the first round after a 3–5 loss to Hampstead F.C., who was participating in the competition for the first time. In the semi-finals, Hampstead knocked out the three-time winners Racing Club de Bruxelles (3–1) and then met the two-time winners Union Saint-Gilloise in the final, who at the time had quite possibly one of the best teams in whole Europe, having just won the Belgian championship for the fourth time in a row. Saint-Gilloise had trashed Dortmund FC with a resounding 12–0 win in the first round and then comfortably got past the semi-finals with a 4–0 win. However, despite the clear superiority of the Belgs, Hampstead was able to compete head-to-head with them, and in the end, they lost by just one goal (0–1). Union Saint-Gilloise thus lifted the trophy for the third time in a row in a time where winning a cup for three years in a row meant gaining the right to keep the cup, meaning that Saint-Gilloise became the definitive holders of the Coupe Van der Straeten Ponthoz trophy.

Results

Champions

List of finals

Titles by club

Titles by country

Legacy
The success of the first edition led to the introduction of the Coupe Vanden Abeele in Antwerp in the following year, originally intended as an international club tournament as well, but eventually the starting point for the Low Countries derby. After winning the Coupe Van der Straeten Ponthoz for the third time in a row, Union Saint-Gilloise became the definitive holders of the cup. A new trophy was therefore put into play, which was the Coupe Jean Dupuich. The new cup was offered by Alphonse Dupuich and named in honor of his son Jean, hence the name.

See also
Challenge Cup
Challenge International du Nord
Coupe Jean Dupuich
Mitropa Cup
European Cup

References

External links
Coupe Van der Straeten Ponthoz results

Defunct international club association football competitions in Europe
Belgian football friendly trophies
Dutch football friendly trophies
Swiss football friendly trophies
French football friendly trophies
English football friendly trophies
Recurring sporting events established in 1900